Jana Yuddha was an organ of the Bengal Committee of the Communist Party of India. The first issue of the paper was published on May 1, 1942.

References

Communist newspapers
Newspapers published in India
Communist periodicals published in India
Newspapers established in 1942
1942 establishments in India
Communist Party of India